Candace Robb (born 1950) is an American  historical novelist, whose works are set in medieval England. She has also written under the pen name Emma Campion.

Biography

Candace Robb was born in North Carolina, grew up in Ohio, and now lives in Seattle, Washington with her husband. After an education in Catholic schools, Robb studied and researched medieval history for many years. In an interview, she said, "I did my graduate work in English literature with a strong concentration in medieval and Anglo-Saxon literature and history". After completing her master's degree at the University of Cincinnati in Ohio, she began the Ph.D. programme but did not complete her dissertation.

Before becoming a novelist, she worked as an editor of scientific publications.

She strives for accuracy of historical events which are the backdrop for her fictional characters. Kirkus Reviews said that "Robb puts the history back into historical mystery".

Robb divides her time between the American Pacific Northwest and the UK, frequently spending time in Scotland and in York to research her books.

Selected works

Owen Archer series
The Apothecary Rose (1993)
The Lady Chapel (1994)
The Nun's Tale (1995)
The King's Bishop (1996)
The Riddle of St. Leonard's (1997)
A Gift of Sanctuary (1998)
A Spy for the Redeemer (2002)
The Cross-Legged Knight (2002)
The Guilt of Innocents (2007)
A Vigil of Spies (2008)
The Bone Jar (2016, novella)
A Conspiracy of Wolves (2019)
A Choir of Crows (2020)
The Riverwoman's Dragon (2021)
A Fox in the Fold

Margaret Kerr series
A Trust Betrayed (2000)
The Fire in the Flint (2003)
A Cruel Courtship (2004)

As Emma Campion
The King's Mistress (2010)
A Triple Knot (2014)

Kate Clifford series
The Service of the Dead (2016)
A Twisted Vengeance (2017)
A Murdered Peace (2018)

References

1950 births
Living people
Writers of historical fiction set in the Middle Ages
British historical novelists
English women novelists
20th-century English women writers
20th-century English writers
21st-century English women writers
Women historical novelists
Writers of historical mysteries